Dryocochlias metaformis is a species of medium-sized, air-breathing land snail, a terrestrial pulmonate gastropod mollusk in the family Camaenidae. 

This species can be found in the Philippines.

References

External links
 Férussac, A.E.J.P.F. d'Audebard de. (1821-1822). Tableaux systématiques des animaux mollusques classés en familles naturelles, dans lesquels on a établi la concordance de tous les systèmes; suivis d'un Prodrome général pour tous les mollusques ou fluviatiles, vivantes ou fossiles. Paris, 1821 et 1822.
 Sowerby, G. B., I. (1841). Descriptions of new species of the family Helicidae, collected by Mr. H. Cuming in the Philippine Islands. Proceedings of the Zoological Society of London. 8: 87-91, 96-104, 116-118

Camaenidae
Gastropods described in 1821